This page details Wales national football team records; the most capped players, the players with the most goals, Wales's match record by opponent and decade.

Player records

Most capped players

Top goalscorers

Age records
 Youngest player to make debut: Harry Wilson – 16 years and 207 days
 Oldest player to play a game: Billy Meredith – 45 years and 229 days
 Youngest player to play at World Cup finals: Roy Vernon – 21 years and 42 days
 Oldest player to play at World Cup finals: Dave Bowen – 30 years and 1 day
 Youngest player to score a goal: Gareth Bale – 17 years and 83 days

Other
 Longest serving player: Billy Meredith – 25 years (1895–1920)

Games and results
 Firsts
 First International: 26 March 1876 vs 
 First home international: 5 March 1877 vs 
 First win: 26 February 1881 vs 
 First overseas opponent: , 25 May 1933
 First win over an overseas opponent: 23 November 1949 vs 

 Biggest
 Biggest Win: 11–0 vs , 3 March 1888
 Biggest Loss: 0–9 vs , 23 March 1878

Longest
 Longest winning streak: 6, 2 June 1980 – 16 May 1981
 Longest losing streak: 5, 25 March 1876 – 27 March 1880

Goals
 First Welsh goal: William Davies, 18 January 1879 vs 
 Youngest player to score: Gareth Bale – 17 years and 83 days, 7 October 2006 v 
 Most goals scored in one game by a player: 4
 John Price, 12 Feb 1882 vs 
 Jack Doughty, 3 Mar 1888 vs 
 Mel Charles, 11 Apr 1962 vs 
 Ian Edwards, 25 October 1978 vs

Hat-tricks

 First hat-trick: John Price, 12 February 1882 vs

International tournaments

FIFA World Cup

 Qualification
First match: 15 October 1949 vs 
First goal: Mal Griffiths vs , 15 October 1949

Finals
 First finals: Sweden 1958
 Total number of times qualified for the finals: 2 (1958, 2022)
 First game: 8 June 1958 vs 
 First goal: John Charles vs , 8 June 1958
 Most successful finals: 1958 – Quarter-finals
 World Cup top goalscorer: 2
 Ivor Allchurch (1958)

UEFA European Championship

Finals
 First finals: France 2016
 Total number of times qualified for the finals: 2 (2016, 2020)
 First game: 11 June 2016 vs 
 First goal: Gareth Bale vs , 11 June 2016
 Most successful finals: 2016 – Semi-finals
 European Championship top goalscorer: 3
 Gareth Bale (2016)

Rankings
 Highest FIFA Rank: 8 (October 2015)
 Lowest FIFA Rank: 117 (August 2011)
 Highest Elo Rank: 3 (1876–1885)
 Lowest Elo Rank: 75 (September 2000)

Team records

Head to head

P – Played; W – Won; D – Drawn; L – Lost
Statistics include official FIFA recognised matches only
Up to date as of 29 November 2022

By decade

P – Played,
W – Won,
D – Drawn,
L – Lost,
GF – Goals For,
GA – Goals Against,
GD – Goal Difference
Statistics include official FIFA recognised matches only
Up to date as of 29 November 2022

Notes

  Only clubs played for while receiving caps are listed.

See also

British Home Championship
1954 FIFA World Cup qualification
1958 FIFA World Cup qualification
1958 FIFA World Cup

References

Bibliography

Notes

External links 
RSSSF: Wales – International Results

Wales national football team records and statistics
National association football team records and statistics